

St Michael at the North Gate is a church in Cornmarket Street, at the junction with Ship Street, in central Oxford, England. The name derives from the church's location on the site of the north gate of Oxford when it was surrounded by a city wall.

Since 1971, it has served as the ceremonial City Church of Oxford, and has joined the parishes of the two earlier City Churches with its own.

 The entire tower is accessible to the public, including the top which provides a view of the city as well as an original clockwork mechanism

History
Originally built around 1000–1050, with the tower from 1040 still in existence, the church is Oxford's oldest building. It was constructed of Coral Rag. The church tower is Anglo-Saxon. The architect John Plowman rebuilt the north aisle and transept in 1833.

The Oxford Martyrs were imprisoned in the Bocardo Prison by the church before they were burnt at the stake in what is now Broad Street nearby, then immediately outside the city walls, in 1555 and 1556. Their cell door can be seen on display in the church's tower.

St Michael at the North Gate is the current City Church of Oxford, which is the church where the Mayor and Corporation of Oxford are expected to worship. The title was originally held by St Martin's Church at Carfax, and then by All Saints' Church in the High Street after St Martin's Church was demolished (except for its tower) in 1896. City Church status passed to St Michael's when All Saints' Church was declared redundant in 1971 and was subsequently converted into the library of Lincoln College.  The parishes of St Martin's and All Saints are now amalgamated with St Michael's.

A ceremony, called "beating the bounds", is held each year on Ascension Day to mark out the boundary of the parish.  Led by the vicar, parishioners process around the old boundary stones of the parish; the vicar places a cross in chalk on each, and then church wardens hit the stones with wands made of willow, shouting "Mark, mark, mark!" as they do so.

According to Margaret Murray (writing 1934), there was a sheela na gig figure at St Michael at the North Gate which had a tradition of being shown to brides on their wedding day.

People
William Morris and Jane Burden (who lived off Holywell Street nearby) were married here on 25 April 1859. The marriage certificate is on view in the Saxon tower. John Wesley's pulpit is also on view here.

See also
 Anglo-Saxon architecture
 St Mary Magdalen, Oxford, to the north
 Bocardo Prison

References

External links
 The Parish Church of St Michael at the North Gate with St Martin and All Saints, the City Church of Oxford: official website
 Photograph and other information on OxfordCityGuide.com
 Historic England listing, Church of St Michael
 360° panorama inside the church

11th-century church buildings in England

Michael
Grade I listed buildings in Oxford
History of Oxford
Oxford
Michael
Grade I listed churches in Oxfordshire
Town Gates in England
Former gates